Sandy Point is the second largest town in the island of Saint Kitts, Saint Kitts and Nevis. This town is situated on the north-west coast of St.Kitts and is the capital of Saint Anne Sandy Point Parish.

It is strongly believed that the area known as Sandy Point was the original landing point for the English sea captain and explorer, Sir Thomas Warner, in 1623. After being founded in the 1620s, the town became the commercial centre of St. Kitts and was one of the busiest ports in the region, as evidenced by the remains of the many former Dutch warehouses lining the shoreline, which once totalled over 300. 

After 1727, when the bulk of commercial activity was moved to Basseterre, the town and its port slowly diminished in importance. In 1984, the port was closed entirely following the impact of Hurricane Klaus. Sandy Point has a population of 3,140.

The greatest evidence of the town's former wealth can be seen in Brimstone Hill Fortress National Park, a UNESCO World Heritage Site. The largest fortress ever built in the Eastern Caribbean by the British, this fortress was constructed to defend the town's port and the downhill fortress of Fort Charles (Saint Kitts), which in turn was the colony's second largest fortification.

Today, the main industrial activity in Sandy Point Town is manufacturing aeronautics equipment. It is also a tourism centre. Nearby villages include Fig Tree, Half Way Tree and Newton Ground.

References

Populated places in Saint Kitts and Nevis
Saint Kitts (island)
Populated places established in 1623
1623 establishments in the British Empire
1623 establishments in North America
1620s in the Caribbean